The 1906–07 Federal Amateur Hockey League (FAHL) season lasted from December 28 until March 6. The four teams were to play a twelve game schedule, but the season ended early when two teams resigned from the league – the Montreal Montagnards over a dispute with a league ruling, and Cornwall HC when their top scorer, Owen 'Bud' McCourt, died following an on-ice brawl with the Ottawa Victorias. Ottawa were awarded the season championship.

Season 

Morrisburg HC joined the league for the season, but was not of the same calibre as the others and did not win a game.

Highlights 

Cornwall defeated Ottawa Victorias on February 15. Ottawa protested the game, as Cornwall players Degray and McCourt had also played two games that season with the Montreal Shamrocks in the rival Eastern Canada Amateur Hockey Association (ECAHA). The FAHL ordered the match be replayed, in Cornwall, on March 6, and did allow McCourt to play for Cornwall. During an on-ice brawl at the rematch, McCourt was struck in the head by the hockey sticks of two or more Ottawa players and knocked unconscious. McCourt died the next day, and Cornwall resigned from the league.

The Montagnards also used two players from the ECAHA's Montreal Shamrocks when they played Cornwall on February 25, winning the game 7–3. When Cornwall was told by the FAHL that they must replay Ottawa for using ECAHA players on February 15, they protested the February 25 game on the same grounds. When the FAHL agreed, the Montagnards refused to play the rematch and resigned from the league.

Final Standing 

† Morrisburg defaulted 4 games.

Schedule and results 

‡ Defaulted by Morrisburg.

Player statistics

Goaltending averages 
Note: GP = Games played, GA = Goals against, SO = Shutouts, GAA = Goals against average

Scoring leaders

See also 
 1907 ECAHA season
 Federal Amateur Hockey League
 List of Stanley Cup champions
 List of pre-NHL seasons
 List of ice hockey leagues

References 

 

Federal Amateur Hockey League seasons
FAHL